Osier is a populated place in Conejos County, Colorado, USA. It is an old railroad settlement and train stop approximately halfway along the Cumbres and Toltec Scenic Railroad where trains from both ends of the line meet and stop for lunch, making it possible for passengers to either continue in the same direction or return to their point of origin afterwards.

This location by the Rio de Los Pinos river was the halfway point on the old toll road from Conejos, Colorado, to Chama, New Mexico, and can be reached by Forest Road 103 from State Highway 17.

History
In 1878, the valley where Osier lies was the location of the toll gate for the Park View and Ft. Garland toll road. In 1880, the Denver and Rio Grande Railroad created Osier in the course of building the narrow gauge San Juan Extension from Alamosa, Colorado, to Durango, Colorado.

The Rio Grande built several other structures at Osier including a section house, station, water tank and bunk house. More recently, the Rio Grande's successor, the Cumbres and Toltec Scenic Railroad, built a kitchen and dining facility where passengers are served a hot lunch every day the trains are running (which is only during the summer season).  

Osier was where six snowmobile riders sought refuge after becoming lost in the Colorado backcountry in early January 2008. A snowstorm and threat of avalanche delayed rescuers, and the two families in the group broke into the kitchen where they found popcorn, chicken bouillon and gravy mix, keeping them alive until help could arrive.

Location
 Osier Station

Nearby locations along the Cumbres & Toltec
Cumbres Pass 
Toltec Gorge 
Sublette Station

See also
Cumbres and Toltec Scenic Railroad

References

External links
Official Cumbres & Toltec Scenic Railroad web site
 Narrow Gauge Caterers, Inc., who feed the passengers at Osier

Unincorporated communities in Conejos County, Colorado
Denver and Rio Grande Western Railroad
Populated places established in 1880
1880 establishments in Colorado
Unincorporated communities in Colorado